Ghanshyam Tiwari (born 29 June 1979) is an Indian politician and the current National Spokesperson of the Samajwadi Party. He served as the advisor to the JD (U) government in Bihar from 2010 to 2015. In 2019, Ghanshyam contested the Lok Sabha constituency of Karakat in the general election. The seat was won by Mahabali Singh.

Early life and education
The son of an Air Force officer, Ghanshyam was born in 1979 in Andhra Pradesh. He travelled across India in his childhood and later went abroad for higher studies. Hailing originally from Gorari village in Bihar's Rohtas district, he was schooled at various Kendriya Vidyalaya, then obtained his bachelor's degree in electrical engineering at NIT Surathkal. Ghanshyam did an executive management program at IIM Bangalore in 2005. He completed an MBA degree from Kellogg School of Management in 2011. At Harvard Kennedy School he earned a master's degree in public administration and public policy.

Political career
 2010–2016: Ghanshyam was Janata Dal (United) Bihar unit's chief's advisor from 2010 to 2015. He was also the communication advisor to the CM and party spokesperson until 2016.
 2017–present: National Spokesperson of the Samajwadi Party

Professional career
Ghanshyam has worked with global organizations like the Bill and Melinda Gates Foundation, Intel and McKinsey & Company.

See also 
 Suresh Tiwari
 Anurag Bhadouria
 K. C. Tyagi

References

External links
 Chief Minister's office
 Government of Uttar Pradesh
 Official website of Samajwadi Party

Samajwadi Party politicians
 
National Institutes of Technology alumni
Kellogg School of Management alumni
Harvard Kennedy School alumni
1979 births
Living people
Janata Dal (United) politicians